Sandis Smons (born 19 May 1999) is a Latvian professional ice hockey defenceman who is currently playing with HC La Chaux-de-Fonds of the Swiss League (SL) as a prospect to Genève-Servette HC of the National League (NL). He plays in Switzerland with a Swiss player-license.

Playing career
Smons made his professional debut with the Ticino Rockets of the Swiss League (SL) during the 2018–19 season, appearing in 2 games this season.

On 18 August 2019, Smons signed his first professional contract with Genève-Servette HC for the 2019/20 season. He was immediately loaned to HC Sierre of the SL to begin the 2019–20 season and was called up on September 23, 2019 by Genève-Servette to replace injured Henrik Tömmernes.

International play
Smons made his debut with Latvia men's national team in 2020.

Personal life
Smons moved to Geneva, Switzerland at age 15 to play his junior hockey with Genève-Servette which allows him to play in the National league and in the Swiss League with a Swiss player-license. He is fluent in both Latvian and French.

References

External links

1999 births
Living people
Genève-Servette HC players
HC La Chaux-de-Fonds players
Latvian ice hockey defencemen
HC Sierre players
HCB Ticino Rockets players